Peter Milkovich (born October 17, 1966) is a Canadian field hockey player and coach. He was born in Vancouver, British Columbia.

References

External links
 

1966 births
Living people
Canadian field hockey coaches
Canadian male field hockey players
Olympic field hockey players of Canada
Field hockey players at the 1988 Summer Olympics
Field hockey players at the 2000 Summer Olympics
Pan American Games gold medalists for Canada
Pan American Games silver medalists for Canada
Field hockey players at the 1991 Pan American Games
Field hockey players at the 1995 Pan American Games
Field hockey players at the 1999 Pan American Games
Canadian expatriate sportspeople in the United States
Canadian people of Croatian descent
Field hockey players from Vancouver
Pan American Games medalists in field hockey
1998 Men's Hockey World Cup players
West Vancouver Field Hockey Club players
1990 Men's Hockey World Cup players
Medalists at the 1995 Pan American Games
Medalists at the 1991 Pan American Games